Talugtug, officially the Municipality of Talugtug, is a 4th class municipality in the province of Nueva Ecija, Philippines. According to the 2020 census, it has a population of 25,236 people.

Geography
It is bounded on the South by the Municipality of Guimba; on the southeast by the Science City of Muñoz; on the west by Cuyapo, on the east by Lupao, all of which are in the province of Nueva Ecija. On the northernmost side of Talugtug is the boundary of Pangasinan with the municipality of Umingan.

Talugtug is characterized by hilly and rolling land in the north-eastern and north-western section of the municipality covering almost 7 barangays. The foot of two mountain ranges, namely Mt. Baloy (with peak in Cuyapo) and Mt. Amorong (with peak in Umingan, Pangasinan) occupies its hilly and rolling areas.

About 70% of the land is flat and constitutes the agricultural area of the municipality, where almost 75% of its total rice production comes from.

Climate

Barangays
Talugtug is politically subdivided into 28 barangays.

 Alula
 Baybayabas
 Buted
 Cabiangan
 Calisitan
 Cinense
 Culiat
 Maasin
 Magsaysay (Poblacion)
 Mayamot I
 Mayamot II
 Nangabulan
 Osmeña (Poblacion)
 Villa Fronda
 Patola
 Quezon (Poblacion)
 Quirino (Poblacion)
 Roxas (Poblacion)
 Saguing
 Sampaloc
 Santa Catalina
 Santo Domingo
 Saverona
 Tandoc
 Tibag
 Villa Rosario
 Villa Rosenda (formerly Saringaya)
 Villa Boado

Demographics

Economy 

The municipality's status is currently fourth class. Majority of the inhabitants rely mainly on farming from their small farm holdings while the rest depend on pasturing animals.

References

External links

 [ Philippine Standard Geographic Code]
Philippine Census Information
Local Governance Performance Management System

Municipalities of Nueva Ecija